Johnny Jansen (born 2 March 1975) is a Dutch professional football manager and former player who was the manager of the Eredivisie club Heerenveen until his dismissal on 24 January 2022.

Managerial career
Jansen began his playing career with Heerenveen, but had to cut his playing career short due to being diagnosed with diabetes. and spent his later playing career in amateur leagues in the Netherlands. In the year 2000, he began working with Heerenveen as an academy manager, and in 2014 was appointed assistant manager. On 3 June 2019, he was named the head manager of Heerenveen in the Eredivisie.

References

External links
 
 
 Bild Profile

1975 births
Living people
Sportspeople from Heerenveen
Footballers from Friesland
Dutch footballers
Association football midfielders
SC Heerenveen players
SC Veendam players
Eerste Divisie players
Dutch football managers
SC Heerenveen managers
SC Heerenveen non-playing staff
Eredivisie managers
20th-century Dutch people